A city editor is a title used by a particular section editor of a newspaper. They are responsible for the daily changes of a particular issue of a newspaper that will be released in the coming day. Mostly they stay at the publication at night and track news that happens anytime.

In North and South America it refers to the editor responsible for the news coverage of a newspaper's local circulation area (also sometimes called metro editor)
In the United Kingdom (often with a capital C) it refers to the editor responsible for coverage of business in the City of London and, by extension, coverage of business and finance in general.

Types of editors